King Abdul Aziz Mosque or Marbella Mosque is an Islamic place of worship located in Marbella, Province of Málaga, Andalusia, Spain. It is financed by Saudi Arabia, and is named after their first monarch. It was built in 1981 and is one of the first Spanish mosques built in the modern time.

Along with the Fuengirola Mosque and Malaga Mosque, the Marbella Mosque was financed with money from Saudi Arabia, and is therefore a part of the Salafi school of thought, a movement dominant in Saudi Arabia. The construction was ordered by Prince Salman in honor of King Fahd, who was a frequenter of Marbella.

The building architecture is an example of Andalusian-inspired contemporary Arabic architecture. Built by Córdoban architect Juan Mora, it holds over 800 people and consists of housing for the imam, library and gardens.

See also
 Islam in Spain
 List of mosques in Spain
 List of things named after Saudi Kings

References

Andalusian Catacombs of Islam

Buildings and structures in Marbella
Mosques in Spain
Mosque buildings with domes